Archibald May Stimmel (May 30, 1873 – August 18, 1958), was a Major League Baseball pitcher who played from  to  with the Cincinnati Reds. He batted and threw right-handed.

Born in the home in which he lived in Woodsboro, Maryland, Archie Stimmel was the son of  Edward H. Stimmel and Mary Jane Barrick Stimmel.

The Woodsboro hurler got his first chance in the professional baseball ranks with Scranton of the old Eastern League. He was shipped to Pottsville in the Pennsylvania State League and later advanced to the Richmond club in the Virginia State League. It was at Richmond that Stimmel felt he turned in his greatest mound accomplishment. He went 17 innings for a 2–2 tie against Red Ames of Hartford, who later moved along to fame with the New York Giants under the great John McGraw. After his work at Richmond and subsequently with the Allentown, Pennsylvania team, Stimmel attracted the attention of Cincinnati scouts. Starting in 1900, he was one of the regular Reds hurlers for a few years.

Archie Stimmel died at Frederick Memorial Hospital in Frederick, Maryland about 4 a. m. on Sunday August 18, 1958 after a lingering illness. He was 85.

External links

1873 births
1958 deaths
Major League Baseball pitchers
Baseball players from Maryland
Cincinnati Reds players
Chambersburg Maroons players
Scranton Miners players
Roanoke Magicians players
Richmond Giants players
Allentown Peanuts players
Richmond Bluebirds players
Indianapolis Hoosiers (minor league) players
St. Paul Saints (AA) players
Milwaukee Brewers (minor league) players
Minneapolis Millers (baseball) players
Colorado Springs Millionaires players
Pueblo Indians players
Lincoln Treeplanters players
19th-century baseball players